Vidin Grad was a fortress, located at the top of the Vidojevica hill, near village Lešnica, municipality of Loznica,

Today, little remain of fortification walls and towers which are spreading on the top of the hill, on a plateau with rough dimensions of 50 m diameter. From it, the terrain steep drops on all sides to dry ditch, which is spreading around the entire fortress to protected the access to it.

Remains of walls, made of roughly trimmed stone, are largely covered with vegetation, and their original thickness is estimated at about 100 cm. They were reinforced with at least two towers, whose ruins can be seen on the ground.

See also
Koviljkin grad
Trojanov Grad
Gensis (vicus)

References
 Aleksandar Deroko, "Medieval cities in Serbia, Montenegro and Macedonia, Belgrade, 1950.

Gallery

External links 

Location of Vidin Grad from a Bing Maps

Loznica
Archaeological sites in Serbia
Roman towns and cities in Serbia